Mount Seir (Har Sēʿīr) is the ancient and biblical name for a mountainous region stretching between the Dead Sea and the Gulf of Aqaba in the northwestern region of Edom and southeast of the Kingdom of Judah. It may also have marked the older historical limit of Ancient Egypt in Canaan. A place called "Seir, in the land of Shasu" (ta-Shasu se`er, t3-sh3sw s`r), thought to be near Petra, Jordan, is listed in the temple of Amenhotep III at Soleb (ca. 1380 BC). 

The modern Arabic equivalent is thought to be Jibal ash-Sharah in Jordan.

Hebrew Bible

The Hebrew Bible mentions two distinct geographical areas named Seir: a 'land of Seir' and 'Mount Seir' in the South, bordered by the Arabah to the west; and another 'Mount Seir' further north, on the north boundary of Judah, mentioned in the Book of Joshua.

Southern land of Seir, Mount Seir
Mount Seir was named for Seir the Horite, whose offspring had previously inhabited the area. The children of Esau, the Edomites, battled against the Horites and destroyed them (Deuteronomy ). Mount Seir is specifically noted as the place where Esau made his home (Genesis ; Joshua ).

In the Book of Numbers, the prophet Balaam, predicting Israelite victories over the Trans-Jordanian nations at the end of their Exodus from Egypt, stated "Edom shall be a possession; Seir also, his enemies, shall be a possession".

Mount Seir is also given as the location where the remnants "of the Amalekites that had escaped" were annihilated by five hundred Simeonites (1 Chronicles ). In , the "inhabitants of Mt. Seir", i.e. the Edomites, came along with the Ammonites and Moabites against Jehoshaphat of Judah, however "the LORD set ambushments" against them, causing their forces to annihilate one another.

Northern Mount Seir

Egyptian sources
Before the emergence of the Israelite kingdoms and of Edom, with Mount Seir standing on the Edomite side of the border, this range marked the southeastern border of Egyptian Canaan (Late Bronze Age). This is suggested by the description of the military campaign undertaken in Canaan by Ramses III (r. 1186–1155 BCE), and possibly also by the Amarna letter EA 288, if "the land of Šeru" is to be understood to mean Seir.

See also
Al-Sharat, region In Jordan and Saudi Arabia containing Jibāl ash-Sharāh

References

Book of Deuteronomy
Book of Ezekiel
Book of Genesis
Book of Isaiah
Book of Joshua
Book of Numbers
Books of Chronicles
Edom
Seir
Mountains of the West Bank